Iris was an American synthpop band, formed by Reagan Jones and Mat Morris in 1993. After the release of their first album Disconnect, Matthew Morris was replaced with Andrew Sega, who pushed the band's sound in a more experimental electronic direction. Their final album, Six, was released in September 2019. Iris disbanded in 2021.

History

The band was initiated in 1993 as Forgiving Iris, with members Reagan Jones (vocals/keyboards), Matt Morris (keyboards/programming). The two had met in college and, influenced by artists such as Erasure and Depeche Mode, began playing covers locally in Austin, Texas. In 1998 they changed their name to Iris and released their debut full-length, Disconnect, which netted them "Best Band" and "Best Album" awards at the American Synthpop Awards in 2000. Its single "Annie, Would I Lie To You?" was one of the best-selling records in label A Different Drum’s history.

After several shows that followed, Reagan Jones and Matthew Morris started having arguments about their musical direction. Morris became focused on his personal life, and wasn't interested into going back to the studio for the second album. Jones met Andrew Sega through the original singer of CTRL Joel Willard in 2001, and told him that he was looking for someone new to work with. Sega and Jones started working on some test tracks, the first of which would later become "Unknown". They felt that the chemistry between the two worked out so well that they started working on the new record that would become Awakening. Sega added guitars and pushed the band's sound into a more experimental electronic direction. They released their second album Awakening throughout Sega's new label, Diffusion Records. Their next record, Wrath (2005) took a more aggressive approach. Its first single, "Appetite" went No. 1 on mainstream radio in Poland. A European tour followed, including festivals in Moscow and London.

In 2008, Iris released their first CD/DVD combo, Hydra. It featured 3 brand new tracks, as well as remixes from bands like Mesh, Alpinestars, Datguy, Benz & MD, plus a 40 minute "behind the scenes" tour diary DVD.

In 2010, Iris released Blacklight through Infacted Recordings. After finishing its supporting tour in the U.S., the duo parted ways due to a tour argument. There was more than a year of silence between the band members, which ended when Jones sent Sega three demo songs.

In 2014, Iris signed with Dependent Records and released Radiant through the label, followed by Six in 2019.

Iris disbanded in September 2021. Dependent Records confirmed their split, saying that it was caused due to "personal differences".

Members

Final line-up
 Reagan Jones - vocals, songwriting, keyboards (1993–2021)
 Andrew Sega - keyboards, guitars, programming, production (2002–2021)

Former members
 Matthew Morris - keyboards, programming, production (1993–2002)
 Marc Schultz - keyboards

Additional touring members
 Ned Kirby (Stromkern) - keyboards, bass
 Brian Pearson - guitars
 Blitz Carthey - drums

Discography

Studio albums
Disconnect (2000)
Awakening (2003)
Wrath (2005)
Blacklight (2010)
Radiant (2014)
Six (2019)

Singles & EPs
Danger Is The Shame (1999)
Saving Time (1999)
Annie, Would I Lie To You (1999)
Lose In Wanting (2000)
Unknown (2002)
Appetite (2005)
It Generates (2006)
Hell's Coming With Me / Appetite (Remixes) (2006)
Lands Of Fire 2008 (2008)
Closer To Real (2010)
Radiant Turbulence (2014) (Joint EP with Seabound)
Phenom EP (2014) (Included in Radiant Complete Edition)

Other albums
Reconnect (2003) - Remix Album, covering tracks from Disconnect
Hydra (2008) - Remix Album (covering tracks from Wrath and Awakening), plus three new tracks ("New Invaders", "Stop Breaking Your Own Heart", "Nobody Wins") and a DVD with interviews, live show cuts, etc.
Radiant Complete Edition (2014) - Collector's Edition Album of Radiant. A two vinyl & two CD version, which includes Phenom EP with its new songs ("Sing, Dark Choir" and "Inside We Are All One") on one of the CDs.
Six (Luxus) (2019) - 500 Copy Limited Edition Album of Six. Includes two more songs ("I Wanna Be Adored" and "Price I Have To Pay") and three remixes by other bands, as well as an artbook.

References

External links

 
 
 
 Iris at Gothicparadise

Electronic music groups from California
Electronic music duos
Musical groups from Los Angeles
Musical groups established in 1993
American synth-pop groups
American electronic rock musical groups
1993 establishments in California
Dependent Records artists
Musical groups disestablished in 2021